Auge was the daughter of Aleus and mother of the hero Telephus in Greek Mythology.

Auge or Augé may also refer to:

People
Augé (surname)
Auge, a Greek goddess, one of the Horae or hours in Greek time measurement
Auge, nickname for German footballer Klaus Augenthaler

Places
 Auge, Ardennes, France
 Auge, Creuse, France
 Augé, Deux-Sèvres, France
 Auge-Saint-Médard, in the Charente département, France
the Pays d'Auge, an area of France

Other
Augé (automobile), an early French automobile

See also
Augen (disambiguation)